Retribution is the seventh studio album by Swedish rock band Nightingale, released on November 10, 2014 in Europe and January 27, 2015 in North America via Inside Out Music.

Background
Vocalist and guitarist Dan Swanö commented on Retribution:

Swanö also elaborated on the song "Forevermore" and "On Stolen Wings":

Track listing

Personnel
Nightingale
 Dan Swanö – vocals, guitars, keyboards
 Dag Swanö – guitars, keyboards
 Erik Oskarsson – bass
 Tom Björn – drums

Production
 Dan Swanö – production, mixing, mastering
 Travis Smith – artwork
 Thomas Ewerhard – layout
 Eva Maria Swanö – photography

References

2014 albums
Nightingale (band) albums
Inside Out Music albums
Albums produced by Dan Swanö